Sekou V. Keita (born November 30, 1979) is a Liberian retired footballer who last played for FC Olimpia Bălţi.

International career 
He was also a member of the Liberia national football team.

External links 
 

1984 births
Living people
Liberian footballers
Liberian expatriate footballers
Expatriate soccer players in the United States
Association football forwards
Expatriate footballers in Moldova
Expatriate footballers in Mali
Expatriate footballers in Senegal
Liberian expatriate sportspeople in the United States
Liberian expatriate sportspeople in Moldova
Liberian expatriate sportspeople in Mali
People from Nimba County
CSF Bălți players
AS Bamako players
ASC Jeanne d'Arc players
Liberia international footballers